The 1996 Villanova Wildcats football team was an American football team that represented the Villanova University as a member of the Yankee Conference during the 1996 NCAA Division I-AA football season. In their 12th year under head coach Andy Talley, the team compiled a 8–4 record.

Schedule

References

Villanova
Villanova Wildcats football seasons
Villanova Wildcats football